The seventh season of the American drama television series 24, also known as Day 7, premiered in the United States on Fox on January 11, 2009, and concluded on May 18, 2009. The season was originally scheduled to premiere on January 13, 2008, but was delayed due to the 2007–08 Writers Guild of America strike. On November 23, 2008, Fox aired 24: Redemption, a two-hour TV movie set between seasons. Unlike all of the other seasons, this season's DVD set was released one day after the season finale. The season's storyline begins and ends at 8:00 a.m.

Season overview
The seventh season takes place 46 months after season six and two months after 24: Redemption. Jack Bauer is on trial for alleged crimes he committed while working for CTU. Senator Blaine Mayer has disbanded CTU and strengthened the policies of President of the United States of America Allison Taylor's administration against torture. Bauer is brought into another counter-terrorist operation when FBI Special Agent Renee Walker interrupts the hearing to tell him about an imminent threat.

Day 7 can be divided into four main acts:
 Warlord Iké Dubaku breaches a government firewall and attempts to cause massive damage, then tries to manipulate President Taylor by kidnapping her husband.
 A unit of soldiers from Sangala invades the White House and takes President Taylor hostage.
 Mercenaries from Starkwood acquire a prion weapon and threaten to deploy it on major American cities.
 Tony Almeida betrays Jack and the FBI by stealing the last canister of the pathogen and attempting to use it against civilians.

Major subplots
 Senators are trying to send Jack to prison for life to make an example out of him.
 Members of the Taylor family are still mourning the loss of Roger Taylor.
 Tony Almeida's return to the series.
 While Jack is happy to have his old friend back, he feels that something is not quite right.
 Larry Moss tries to keep Renee Walker on the side of the law rather than adopting Jack's ruthless ways.
 Renee has difficulty accepting situations that put civilians at risk for the greater good.
 Allison Taylor begins to rethink the position she took against torture.
 A rivalry between Ethan Kanin and Olivia Taylor unfolds at the White House.
 Chloe clashes with an FBI analyst named Janis Gold.
 Jack becomes infected with a lethal pathogen and struggles to make peace before he dies.
 Kim Bauer has one last opportunity to reconnect with her father.

Summary
Day 7 begins in a U.S. Senate hearing during which Jack Bauer defends the necessity of his actions to Senator Blaine Mayer. Special Agent Renee Walker postpones the proceedings saying that the Federal Bureau of Investigation (FBI) urgently needs Jack's help. Even though Jack refuses to believe it at first, she reveals that Tony Almeida is still alive and that he is launching an attack against the government that betrayed him. When a contact agrees to talk to Bauer and Walker and is assassinated, the sniper leads them to Tony's location. Jack captures Tony and brings him to the FBI but learns that he is part of an undercover operation involving Bill Buchanan and Chloe O'Brian that aims to expose corruption in the government.

Jack breaks Tony out of the FBI's headquarters and meets with Bill and Chloe at a hideout that serves as a sort of underground CTU. There, he learns that Benjamin Juma and Iké Dubaku have infiltrated the government in order to stop the U.S. from invading Sangala. Dubaku plans to attack government infrastructure using the "CIP device" and have the Sangalan President, Ule Matobo, kidnapped. Jack and Tony team up with one of Dubaku's contacts, David Emerson, and proceed to kidnap Matobo. Along the way, Renee Walker discovers them. Instead of killing her, Jack manages to keep his cover safe by shooting her in the neck, burying her alive and sending her location to Chloe and Bill. After Tony reluctantly kills Emerson, the group hand Matobo over to Dubaku's henchmen and begin an assault once they learn Dubaku's location. During the assault, they rescue Matobo and destroy the CIP device but Dubaku escapes.

Dubaku attempts to manipulate President Taylor by kidnapping Henry Taylor but Jack and Renee find the First Gentleman by interrogating a U.S. Secret Service agent. During the rescue, Henry Taylor suffers a gunshot wound from which he eventually recovers. With Dubaku on the run, Walker and Bauer are able to find him with the help of his girlfriend Marika. Although Dubaku's vehicle crashes in a car chase killing Marika, Dubaku survives with enough strength to provide Bauer with a list of names of his co-conspirators. Buchanan uses this list to begin making arrests. When the arrests are in progress, Tony informs Jack that General Juma is planning an attack and tells him that Senator Mayer's chief of staff Ryan Burnett knows the details. Jack begins to torture Burnett but he is apprehended before he can finish. Juma is able to attack his target—which turns out to be the White House—and Jack, Bill and Taylor find themselves held hostage.

Although Jack plans to save the hostages by sacrificing himself, Bill Buchanan does this instead, saying that a dangerous conspiracy still remains and that Jack is the only person he trusts to unravel it. When Jack tries to get further information out of Burnett, a mercenary arrives who kills Burnett and frames Bauer for the murder. When Jack escapes, he learns that the mercenary, John Quinn, works for Starkwood—a defense contractor with an interest in developing bioweapons—led by a man named Jonas Hodges. After he is framed for the murder of U.S. Senator Mayer, Jack kills Quinn and learns the location of a bioweapon that just arrived from Sangala. He and Tony initiate a raid, which results in Tony's capture by Starkwood. Jack drives the weapon away from the port but is delayed when he stops to seal one of the leaking canisters. This not only exposes him to the pathogen but allows Starkwood to recapture it as well.

Jack learns that he is dying and tries to see the operation through to the end before he dies. He has an emotional meeting with his daughter Kim and tells Kim that he does not want her to try to save him with stem cells. FBI and military forces land in the Starkwood base and meet Tony Almeida but Starkwood forces outnumber them and force them to retreat. Tony sneaks away from the group and is able to remain at the base unseen. Co-ordinating with Jack, he destroys the canisters of the prion which allows the government to move in and arrest Hodges. To everyone's surprise, a Starkwood operative, Robert Galvez is seen with a surviving canister of the pathogen and a helicopter with Tony Almeida and Larry Moss on board gives chase. Tony betrays the FBI by killing Moss and helping Galvez escape the perimeter before escaping himself. Furious, Jack learns from Hodges that Tony has been in league with private military contractors all along and that he is working to have Islamic-Americans carry out a biological attack.

Tony and a co-conspirator named Cara Bowden force an innocent Muslim man to frame himself for a subway attack, by making a video and riding the subway, without knowing the details of what he's being framed for. Bowden delivers the canister of pathogenic agent, with a fifteen-minute timer on it, to the subway car the young man is riding, then exits. Jack intercepts the canister just in time but is forced to turn on the FBI and free Tony when he learns that Bowden's operatives are following Kim. Tony convinces Cara and the leader of their group named Alan Wilson to harvest the pathogen from Jack's body. Tony tells Jack in private that his plan is really to bring Alan Wilson into the open so that he can be murdered; Alan Wilson was the man behind Charles Logan, who had both David Palmer and Michelle Dessler murdered. FBI agents arrive at the compound having learned of Jack's location from a rescued Kim Bauer. A firefight ensues which is ended by Jack and Renee who stop Almeida from killing Wilson. Renee decides to torture Wilson when she learns that he has covered all his tracks. After Jack's doctor induces a coma, Kim arrives and begs her to begin the stem cell procedure that Jack told her not to undergo. The season ends with Kim at her father's side, left with a thread of hope that he may survive.

Characters

Starring
 Kiefer Sutherland as Jack Bauer (24 episodes)
 Mary Lynn Rajskub as Chloe O'Brian (13 episodes)
 Cherry Jones as President Allison Taylor (23 episodes)
 James Morrison as Bill Buchanan (10 episodes)
 Annie Wersching as Renee Walker (24 episodes)
 Colm Feore as First Gentleman Henry Taylor (12 episodes)
 Bob Gunton as Ethan Kanin (18 episodes)
 Jeffrey Nordling as Larry Moss (19 episodes)
 Rhys Coiro as Sean Hillinger (10 episodes)
 Janeane Garofalo as Janis Gold (21 episodes)
 Carlos Bernard as Tony Almeida (20 episodes)

Special guest stars
 Kurtwood Smith as Senator Blaine Mayer (6 episodes)
 Elisha Cuthbert as Kim Bauer (5 episodes)

Special guest appearance by
 Jon Voight as Jonas Hodges (10 episodes)

Guest starring

Episodes

Production
Producers were determined to reinvent the series after receiving criticism over the sixth season. They initially devised a storyline which would have Jack Bauer traveling to Sangala trying to find himself, and becoming caught up in a coup with Black Hawk Down-style results.

The decision to scrap the storyline and start over delayed production from July to late August. Filming was delayed a second time (from August 27 to September 10) in order for writers to complete additional scripts.

The crew was scheduled to film scenes with Kiefer Sutherland at the Marine Corps Air Station El Toro on Monday October 22, 2007; however, filming was canceled for health reasons due to raging wildfires in the area. Cast and crew had blurry vision and difficulty breathing from the smoke.  United States Navy SEALs helped battle fictional terrorists at Camarillo Airport during filming of an episode on August 12–13, 2008.

After completion of the 18th episode, production was temporarily shut down on September 15, 2008, for two weeks in order to perform script rewrites for the final six episodes. In an Entertainment Weekly interview, Howard Gordon responded "We just couldn't get this direction to work, and we found another one that we liked better, so we wound up retooling it."

Executive producer and 24 co-creator Joel Surnow left the series on February 12, 2008. His contract with 20th Century Fox was due to expire on April 30 but he requested an early release. "I did some soul-searching. I took [the strike] as an opportunity to write on my own and do other things. After doing 24, I don't know if I want to do a mainstream show again. I like what's going on in cable; there is an opportunity to stretch dramatically there, which is something I'm trying to do." Series co-creator and executive producer Robert Cochran also left the show after the twelfth episode. The position held by Surnow was filled by showrunner Howard Gordon.

Season 7 was dedicated to the memory of Larry Davenport, who was the assistant editor and editor since the first season. He died January 19, 2009.

Tony Almeida was seeming killed in Season 5, but was revealed to be alive in this seventh season. Showrunner Howard Gordon mentioned in an interview that they purposely filmed Tony's death in a way that would allow his eventual return.

Trailer

The debut trailer aired on October 25, 2007. In the trailer, Jack is seen testifying before Congress concerning his past extralegal activities, including the torture of terrorist Ibrahim Haddad. The international version of the trailer is largely identical but features an additional line where Bauer implies personal enjoyment from torturing a suspect. This line is cut from the US version.

A second trailer emphasized the plot concerning the United States losing control of its power lines, water supplies and air traffic control. Jon Cassar confirmed on the Fox message board that the 24: Redemption DVD would have a new alternate trailer for the season as an extra feature and that it contains scenes from the first fourteen episodes.

Writers Guild of America strike
On October 25, 2007, Fox premiered the first trailer and announced the return date for season 7 as January 13, 2008. Just eleven days later, on November 5, 2007, the 2007–2008 Writers Guild of America strike began. Rather than airing the eight completed episodes, Fox executives immediately postponed the season to ensure that it "can air uninterrupted, in its entirety." Fox scheduling chief, Preston Beckman, admitted "It's not a decision we wanted to make, but it's one based on how we feel the viewers expect us to schedule the show."

Following the conclusion of the writers strike, production resumed on April 22, 2008.

Kiefer Sutherland claims the strike was beneficial to the show: "The time allowed us to do something that has never been done before — create a map of the entire season before we started shooting. So I can tell you without hesitation, I know for a fact, that season 7 is going to be the best season yet." Sutherland reiterated this in an interview with TV Guide on August 18, 2008.

24: Redemption

To make up for the lack of any 24 episodes in 2008, Fox aired a two-hour TV movie on Sunday, November 23, 2008, that bridges the gap between seasons 6 and 7.

The storyline takes place during Inauguration Day for the next U.S. President, Allison Taylor, and is shot partially in South Africa. "[Jack] is a soul in turmoil and has been moving from place to place trying to find somewhere he can be at peace," says co-executive producer, Manny Coto. "But he winds up in Sangala, an imaginary country in Africa in the middle of a military coup." While at Sangala, Bauer is subpoenaed to appear before the Senate hearing, but he doesn't want to go. Redemption takes place approximately 42 months after Day 6 and Day 7 takes place 65 days after Redemption.

Energy reduction
Howard Gordon said that 24 cares about the issue of global warming and takes fighting climate change seriously. Measures were taken during the filming of season 7 to make the show carbon neutral. These measures include increased energy efficiency (hybrid vehicles), burning of cleaner fuels (natural gas, biodiesel), and purchase of renewable energy. Through these efforts, the crew was able to reduce the carbon emissions of the show's production by 43%. The remaining emissions will be eliminated with the purchase of carbon offsets. In addition, a series of PSAs with Kiefer Sutherland and other main cast members were produced to educate the public on what they can do to help with the issue.

Reception
On Rotten Tomatoes, the season has an approval rating of 76% with an average score of 8.3 out of 10 based on 33 reviews. The website's critical consensus reads, "New characters and old faces appear as 24 begins to challenge the ethics and morals of its characters."

Cherry Jones, who played President Allison Taylor, won the Emmy for Best Supporting Actress in a Drama Series, becoming the second Emmy Award-winning performer of the show, after Kiefer Sutherland in 2006. IGN's review of Season 7 praises Jon Voight's performance as Jonas Hodges saying "Hodges ends up being more of a Bond villain than a 24 villain – over the top at times, but creative and willing to stop at nothing to execute his plan." The same review disapproves of the season's focus on the politics of torture saying "it was a bit much, putting too much real world politics into what in the past has been great escapist entertainment." On the review aggregator website Metacritic, the seventh season scored 72 out of 100, based on 21 reviews, indicating "Generally favorable reviews" and was considered a huge improvement over the previous season.

Award nominations

Home media releases

References

External links
 

24 (TV series)
2009 American television seasons